The 1925 season was Wisła Krakóws 17th year as a club.

Friendlies

Mistrzostwa Polski

Polish Cup

Squad, appearances and goals

|-
|}

Goalscorers

External links
1925 Wisła Kraków season at historiawisly.pl

Wisła Kraków seasons
Association football clubs 1925 season
Wisla